Donald Loren Smith (born May 9, 1957 in Oakland, California) is a former American football defensive lineman in the National Football League for the Atlanta Falcons, the Buffalo Bills, and the New York Jets.  He played college football at the University of Miami.

External links
NFL.com player page

1957 births
Living people
Players of American football from Oakland, California
American football defensive tackles
American football defensive ends
Miami Hurricanes football players
Atlanta Falcons players
Buffalo Bills players
New York Jets players